is a Japanese bobsledder who has competed since 2009. He finished 21st in the four-man event at the 2010 Winter Olympics in Vancouver, British Columbia, Canada.

Miyauchi's best World Cup finish was 25th in a four-man event at Park City, Utah in November 2009.

References
 
 

1984 births
Bobsledders at the 2010 Winter Olympics
Japanese male bobsledders
Living people
Olympic bobsledders of Japan
21st-century Japanese people